Canuza is a genus of moths of the family Crambidae.

Species
Canuza acmias Meyrick, 1897
Canuza euspilella Walker, 1866

References

Odontiinae
Crambidae genera
Taxa named by Francis Walker (entomologist)